Chester F. Gorman (March 11, 1938 – June 7, 1981) was an American anthropologist and archaeologist.

Born in Oakland, California, he grew up on his parents' dairy farm in Elk Grove. He studied at the Sacramento State University and the University of Hawaii, where he also got his MA and his PhD.

Chester Gorman worked mostly in Southeast Asia. Among the most significant sites he worked are Ban Chiang in northeast Thailand and Spirit Cave in northwest Thailand, one of the major Hoabinhian sites. While surveying for sites in northeast Thailand with Wilhelm Solheim between 1963-1964, Gorman also discovered the site of Non Nok Tha.

Gorman excavated Spirit Cave (Tham Phii Man) once in 1966 for his dissertation research, and again in 1971. He also excavated Banyan Valley Cave (Tham Sai) in 1972 and Steep Cliff Cave (Tham Phaa Can) in 1973.

He died of cancer at age 43 in Sacramento.

Publication record 

 Solheim II, Wilhelm G. and Gorman, Chester F. 1966. Archaeological Salvage Program; Northeastern Thailand-First Season. Journal of the Siam Society 54(2): 111-210.
 Gorman, Chester F. 1969. Hoabinhian: a pebble-tool complex with early plant associations in Southeast Asia. Science 163: 671-673.
 Gorman, Chester F. 1970. Excavations at Spirit Cave, North Thailand: some interim interpretations. Asian Perspectives 13: 79-107.
 Gorman, Chester. 1970. Hoabinhian: a pebble-tool complex with early plant associations in South-East Asia. Proceedings of the Prehistoric Society 35: 355-358.
 Gorman, Chester. 1971. The Hoabinhian and after: subsistence patterns in Southeast Asia during the late Pleistocene and early Recent periods. World Archaeology 2(3): 300-320.
 Gorman, Chester F. 1971. Prehistoric research in northern Thailand: a cultural-chronographic sequence from the late Pleistocene through to the early recent period. Ph.D. dissertation, Department of Anthropology, University of Hawai'i.
 Gorman, Chester and Charoenwongsa, Pisit. 1972. Inundation of archaeological sites. In Ecological reconnaissance of the Quae Yai Hydroelectric Scheme, pp. 131–145. Institute of Technology, Bangkok.
 Gorman, Chester F. and Handman-Xifaras, M.E. 1974. Modeles a priori et préhistoire de la Thailande: a-propos des débuts de l'agriculture en Asie du Sud-Est. Études rurales 53-56: 41-71.
 Gorman, Chester and Charoenwongsa, Pisit. 1976. Ban Chiang: a mosaic of impressions from the first two years. Expedition 18(4): 14-26.
 Gorman, Chester. 1977. A priori models and Thai prehistory: a reconsideration of the beginnings of agriculture in Southeastern Asia. In Origins of Agriculture, edited by C. A. Reed, pp. 321–355. Mouton: The Hague.
 Gorman, C.F. and Charoenwongsa, P. 1978. From Domestication to Urbanization: A Southeast Asian View of Chronology, Configuration and Change. Paper Presented at the Symposium on the Origin of Agriculture and Technology: West or East? Aarhus, Denmark: 1-64.
 Gorman, Chester. 1979. Converging views on S. E. Asian prehistory: from Son-Vi to Dong-son. (Summary in Vietnamese.) Khao Ko Hoc 4:81-82.
 White, Joyce C. and Gorman, Chester F. 2004. Patterns in "Amorphous" Industries: The Hoabinhian Viewed through a Lithic Reduction Sequence. In Southeast Asian Archaeology: Wilhelm G. Solheim II Festschrift, edited by V. Paz, pp. 411–441. The University of the Philippines Press: Diliman, Quezon City.

Published obituaries 

 Chester Gorman Dies at 43. 1981. Journal of the Siam Society 69: 268.
 Rainey, Froelich. 1981. Chester Gorman. Expedition 23(4): 2.
 Solheim II, Wilhelm G. 1982. Obituary: Chester F. Gorman, 1938-1981. American Antiquity 47(4): 795-797.
 Bayard, Donn and Charoenwongsa, Pisit. 1982-1983. Chet Gorman: An Appreciation 11 March 1938 – 7 June 1981. Asian Perspectives 15(1): 1-12.

References

Sources
MSU eMuseum

Historians of Southeast Asia
California State University, Sacramento alumni
University of Hawaiʻi alumni
1938 births
1981 deaths
People from Elk Grove, California
20th-century American archaeologists
20th-century American anthropologists
Historians from California